Hunter Luepke is an American football fullback for the North Dakota State Bison.

Early life and high school
Luepke grew up in Spencer, Wisconsin and attended Spencer High School. He played football on a co-op team composed of students from Spencer and Columbus Catholic High School in Marshfield, Wisconsin. Luepke finished high school with 4452 rushing yards and 82 touchdowns. He also added 644 receiving yard with 9 touchdowns. As a sophomore Luepke helped his team reach the Division 5 State Championship game, where they would lose to the Amherst Falcons.  Luepke committed to play college football at North Dakota State.  Luepke also competed in wrestling, where he was a two time WIAA state champion.

College career
Luepke redshirted his true freshman season with the North Dakota State Bison. He played in 14 games as a redshirt freshman as the Bison won the 2019 FCS national championship. Luepke was named first team All-Missouri Valley Football Conference (MVFC) as a redshirt sophomore after rushing for 458 yards and six touchdowns on 84 carries and caught four passes for 37 yards and one touchdown. Luepke repeated as a first team All-MVFC selection after rushing 87 times for 543 yards and eight touchdowns. Luepke entered his redshirt season season as a top fullback prospect for the 2023 NFL Draft. He rushed for 115 yards and two touchdowns and caught three passes for 65 yards and another touchdown in 31-28 near upset loss to FBS Arizona.

References

External links
North Dakota State Bison bio

Living people
American football fullbacks
North Dakota State Bison football players
Players of American football from Wisconsin
Year of birth missing (living people)